Estonia participated in the VIII Winter Paralympic Games in Salt Lake City, Utah, United States. The Estonian flag bearer at the opening ceremony was Kaido Kalm.

Estonia entered 13 athletes in the following sports:
Ice sledge hockey: 13 males

Medalists

The 2002 Estonian Paralympic Team

The chef de mission for delegation of the 2002 Estonian Paralympics Team was Allan Kiil (Estonian NPC secretary general) and other officials were president of Estonian Union of Sports for the Disabled Siiri Oviir, Estonian NPC president Toomas Vilosius and executive committee member Are Eller.

Ice sledge hockey: Team roster 13 men

Name, no, club, position, goals 
 Kaido Kalm – 16, Tallinn HC Panter, center, captain, 1 goal 
 Jüri Tammleht – 12, Tallinn HC Panter, center, 2 goals
 Aleksandr Jarlõkov – 10, Tallinn HC Panter, forward 
 Arvi Piirioja – 6, Tallinn HC Panter, forward, 1 goal  
 Leonid Zubov – 9, Narva SK Ordo, forward, 1 goal 
 Maksim Vedernikov – 13, Tallinn HC Panter, forward, 4 goals 
 Imre Tiitsu – 11, Tallinn HC Panter, Forward
 Vladimir Savolainen – 2, Narva SK Ordo, defenceman
 Sergei Vesselov – 3, Narva SK Ordo, defenceman
 Viktor Artemjev – 14, Narva SK Ordo, defenceman 
 Andrei Sokolov – 15, Tallinn HC Panter, defenceman
 Vladimir Karandashev – 20, Narva SK Ordo, net minder 
 Valeri Falkenberg – 1, Tallinn HC Panter, net minder  
 Head coach: Anatoli Zahharov, Narva SK Ordo
 Assistant coach: Olle Sildre 
 Trainer:  Dr. Gennadi Kuzmin

Results by event

Ice sledge hockey

Preliminary round
 Preliminary round 1: lost to  1:4 (0:1, 0:2, 1:1)
 09.48 0:1 Jens Kask (Marcus Holm, Rasmus Isaksson)
 17.55 0:2 Marcus Holm (Jens Kask)
 18.20 0:3 Jens Kask (Daniel Cederstam, Marcus Holm)
 30.37 1:3 Juri Tammleht (Leonid Zubov, Aleksander Jarlokov)
 35.36 1:4 Jens Kask (Niklas Ingvarsson)
(Shots on goal: 17–20; penalties: 26-6)

 Preliminary round 2: defeated  2:1 (0:0, 0:1, 2:0)
 22.59 0:1 Takayuki Endo – power play
 30.23 1:1 Maksim Vedernikov (Leonid Zubov, Arvi Piirioja)
 40.41 2:1 Maksim Vedernikov (Aleksandr Jarlokov)
(Shots on goal: 16-13; penalties: 6–16)

 Preliminary round 3: tied  3:3 (2:1, 1:1, 0:1)
 11:34 0:1 Billy Bridges (Lou Mulvihill, Todd Nicholson) – power play
 11:52 1:1 Arvi Piirioja (Kaido Kalm)
 14:25 2:1 Maksim Vedernikov – power play
 20:31 2:2 Jean Labonte (Billy Bridges, Todd Nicholson) – power play
 21:07 3:2 Leonid Zubov (Maksim Vedernikov)
 36:48 3:3 Robert Lagace (Billy Bridges)
 42:40 -:- At the 12:40 mark of the third period with the teams tied at 3–3, Estonia broke in 2-on-1 on the Canadian goal. Maksim Vedernikov rushed down the left side and centered a pass for teammate Kaido Kalm, but Kalm collided with a Canadian defender and the puck appeared to deflect into the net before the net was dislodged. After attending to injured Canadian goalie Paul Rosen, referee Morten Marthinsen never signaled a goal, and after a brief delay ordered a faceoff in the Canadian zone. Replays clearly showed the goal should have counted. The following statement was prepared by Alf Inge Andersen, International Paralympic Committee referee-in-chief for the ice sledge hockey tournament: "The referee (Morten Marthisen), situated near the right faceoff circle (to the goalie's left) did not see the puck cross the goal line. His view was obstructed by players. Neither linesman (Gary Cutler and Bob McMann) could see the puck cross the goal line. The referee declared a no-goal situation.  Unlike International Ice Hockey Federation rules used in the Olympic hockey tournament, video replay is not approved for use in the Paralympic ice sledge hockey tournament."
 
(Shots on goal: 18:17; penalties: 36:10)

 Preliminary round 4: lost to  1:6 (0:2, 1:2, 0:2)
 01:50 0:1 Helge Bjornstad (Tommy Rovelstad)
 14:58 0:2 Helge Bjornstad (Stig Tore Svee)
 23:18 0:3 Tommy Rovelstad (Stig Tore Svee)
 24:51 1:3 Maksim Vedernikov (Kaido Kalm, Sergei Vesselov)
 29:45 1:4 Rolf Einar Pedersen (Helge Bjornstad, Tommy Rovelstad)
 36:46 1:5 Atle Haglund (Erik Sandbraaten, Tommy Rovelstad)
 42:46 1:6 Stig Tore Svee (Geir Arne Skogstad, Helge Bjornstad)
 Preliminary round 5: lost to  1:6 (0:1, 1:1, 0:4)
 04.15 0:1 Sylvester Flis (Joe Howard, Kip St. Germaine)
 24.42 1:1 Juri Tammleht (Sergei Vesselov)
 28.49 1:2 Matt Coppens (Joe Howard, Sylvester Flis)
 35.05 1:3 Sylvester Flis (Matt Coppens)
 36.35 1:4 Joe Howard
 42.30 1:5 Sylvester Flis (Jack Sanders, Joe Howard)
 43.08 1:6 Matt Coppens (Sylvester Flis)
(Shots on goal: 13–19; penalties: 10–12)

Final round
 Final round – classification 5–6 place: lost to  2:6 (0:2, 0:2, 2:2) (→ 6. place)
 04:20 0:1 Atsuya Yaguchi (Mamoru Yoshikawa, Naohiko Ishida)
 13:41 0:2 Mamoru Yoshikawa (Atsuya Yaguchi)
 15:51 0:3 Naohiko Ishida (Mamoru Yoshikawa, Takayuki Endo)
 23:27 0:4 Mamoru Yoshikawa (Naohiko Ishida)
 32:12 1:4 Kaido Kalm (Juri Tammleht, Maksim Vedernikov)
 35:09 1:5 Takayuki Endo (Naohiko Ishida, Mamoru Yoshikawa)
 38:26 2:5 Juri Tammleht (Maksim Vedernikov, Kaido Kalm)
 43:37 2:6 Taimei Shiba (Kazuhiro Takahashi, Kanichi Naito)
(Shots on goal: 12–27; penalties: 10-10)

See also
2002 Winter Paralympics
Estonia at the Paralympics
Estonia at the 2002 Winter Olympics

References

External links
International Paralympic Committee
 Estonian Paralympic Committee
2002.paralympics – athlete biographies

Paralympics
2002
Nations at the 2002 Winter Paralympics